North Carolina Highway 72 (NC 72) is a primary state highway in the U.S. state of North Carolina that serves the communities of Red Springs and Lumberton. The east–west-signed highway physically runs more north and south through Robeson County.

Route description
The western terminus of NC 72 and NC 710 is in Red Springs at the NC 211 intersection. The highway has an interchange with I-95 and US 301 at which point NC 711 ends. Inside Lumberton, it has a concurrency with NC 41. The final leg of the route sees it intersect with NC 211 (also where the NC 41 concurrency ends) then heads south (signed east) to its terminal junction with US 74 (Future I-74) near Orrum and Boardman.

History
NC 72 was created in 1934 running from Red Springs to US 74 near Lumberton.  In 1949, NC 72 was extended to US 301, replacing part of an old alignment of US 74.  In 1983, NC 72 was extended along Fifth Street through Lumberton, then south on Roberts Avenue/Wilmington Highway to its current eastern terminus with US 74.

Major intersections

References

External links

NCRoads.com: N.C. 72

072
Transportation in Robeson County, North Carolina
U.S. Route 74